Lazonby is a civil parish in the Eden District, Cumbria, England.  It contains eleven listed buildings that are recorded in the National Heritage List for England.  All the listed buildings are designated at Grade II, the lowest of the three grades, which is applied to "buildings of national importance and special interest".  The parish contains the village of Lazonby and the surrounding countryside.  The listed buildings comprise houses, farmhouses and farm buildings, a church, a bridge, a boundary stone, a school, a railway viaduct, and a drinking trough for horses.


Buildings

References

Citations

Sources

Lists of listed buildings in Cumbria